Ibrahim Hassan Dankwambo (born 4 April 1962) is a Nigerian politician who was the Governor of Gombe State, Nigeria from 2011 to 2019. He is a former Accountant-General of the Federation.

Early life and education 
Dankwambo was born on 4 April 1962 at Herwagana Gombe.
He graduated from Ahmadu Bello University in 1985, with a degree in Accounting. He obtained a Master of Science degree in Economics from the University of Lagos in 1992 and a PhD in Accounting from Igbinedion University.
He began his career with Coopers & Lybrand in 1985, and worked at the Central Bank of Nigeria from 1988 to 1999. He was then appointed Accountant General of Gombe State, holding this position until 2005.
He was appointed Accountant-General of the Federation on 20 April 2005.
He also served on the Board of the Central Bank of Nigeria. He held this office until he resigned to start his campaign for election as Governor of Gombe State in January 2011.

Political career 
Ibrahim Dankwambo was elected as the Governor of Gombe state on the 26 April 2011 election. He won the election with total votes of 596,481 ahead of Alhaji Abubakar Aliyu of the Congress for Progressive Change (CPC) with 91,781 votes and Senator Sa'idu Umar Kumo of the All Nigeria People's Party with 84,959 votes.

As a Governor, Dankwambo lost his deputy, David Miyims Albashi, who died on 4 November 2011 in a German hospital due to injuries sustained in a car crash on 28 August 2011. On 17 December 2011, Dankwambo appointed Tha'anda Rubainu as Deputy Governor. After his re-election in 2015, Charles Yau Iliya was his deputy governor till the end of his second term in 2019.

Dankwambo was elected into the Senate House of the Federal Republic of Nigeria during the 2023 General elections under the People Democratic Party (PDP).

Fellowship 
He is a fellow of Institute of Chartered Accountant of Nigeria, Chartered Institute of Taxation of Nigeria, Chartered Institute of Bankers and Nigeria Institute of Marketers.

See also
List of Governors of Gombe State

References

1962 births
Living people
Nigerian Muslims
Governors of Gombe State
People from Borno State
Peoples Democratic Party state governors of Nigeria
Ahmadu Bello University alumni
University of Lagos alumni
Nigerian economists